Tyendinaga is a township in the Canadian province of Ontario, located in Hastings County. The community takes its name from a variant spelling of Mohawk leader Joseph Brant's traditional Mohawk name, Thayendanegea. The community actually belongs to the Mohawks of the bay of quinte the land was illegally taken from the Mohawks to build the grand trunk railroad and the kings hwy #2 and later the hwy 401 and is squatted on by the people who live there that's why it shares the same name as the tyendinaga Mohawk territory.

Communities
The township comprises the communities of Albert, Blessington, Chisholms Mills, Ebenezer, Halston, Kingsford, Lonsdale, Lonsdale Station, Melrose, Marysville, Milltown, Myrehall, Naphan, Read and Shannonville.

A radio transmitter for the Canadian Broadcasting Corporation is located in Read. Saint Charles Borromeo Cemetery is also located in Read.

Demographics 

Mother tongue (2016 census):
 English as first language: 97.4%
 French as first language: 0.7%
 Other as first language: 1.9%

Industry 
Shipman’s Flour and Sawmill was constructed in 1851 and bought by William Fraser Chisholm in 1857, and known as Chisholm's Mills since.

See also
List of townships in Ontario

References

External links

Township municipalities in Ontario
Lower-tier municipalities in Ontario
Municipalities in Hastings County